Mickey Charles Shuler Jr. (born October 9, 1986) is a former American football tight end. He is the son of former New York Jets All-Pro tight end, Mickey Shuler.

Early years
He attended East Pennsboro High School in Enola, Pennsylvania. As a junior, he made 40 catches for 562 yards and seven touchdowns. As a senior, he caught 40 passes for 564 yards and three scores and was selected team MVP.

Collegiate career
Shuler scored a 17-yard touchdown on his first collegiate reception, which came in Penn State's the 2007 season-opener against Florida International. He finished that game with four receptions for 54 yards. Playing in every game on offense and special teams in 2007, with three starts.

Shuler's father, Mickey Shuler Sr., was a standout tight end at Penn State, lettering from 1975-77 before embarking on a 14-year career in the National Football League.

Professional career

Minnesota Vikings
Shuler was drafted in the 7th round of the 2010 NFL Draft by the Minnesota Vikings. After scoring a TD in the first pre-season game, Shuler made the final cut and was part of the 53-man roster for the first two weeks of the season. On September 22, 2010, Shuler was cut and placed on waivers to make room for wide-receiver Hank Baskett, and was subsequently claimed by the Miami Dolphins.

Miami Dolphins
On September 23, 2010, Shuler was claimed off waivers by the Miami Dolphins and made his first appearance as a pro in Week 4 versus the New England Patriots. He made his first NFL reception in Miami's Week 16 loss to the Detroit Lions, December 26, 2010. He was waived on September 3, 2011, and was claimed off waivers by the Cincinnati Bengals on September 4, but failed his physical.

Return to Minnesota Vikings
Shuler was signed to the Vikings' practice squad on November 29, 2011. He was promoted to the 53-man roster from the practice squad on December 26, 2011.  On August 31, 2012 as the Vikings reduced their roster down to league maximum of 53 players, he was released.

Oakland Raiders
Shuler was signed to the Oakland Raiders practice squad on October 16, 2012.

Buffalo Bills
Shuler was claimed off waivers by the Buffalo Bills on May 14, 2013. He was released by the Bills on July 27, 2013.

Arizona Cardinals
On July 28, 2013, Shuler was claimed off waivers by the Arizona Cardinals.
Shuler was released by the Cardinals on August 27, 2013.

Atlanta Falcons
Shuler was signed to the Atlanta Falcons practice squad on September 1, 2013. He was waived August 30, 2014.

Jacksonville Jaguars
On August 31, 2014, he was claimed off waivers by the Jacksonville Jaguars. He was released on October 4 after being hospitalized for an illness and signed to the team's practice squad on October 7. He became a free agent after the 2014 season.

Atlanta Falcons (second stint)
Shuler was signed to the Atlanta Falcons future reserve contract on January 1, 2015. He was released on August 30, 2015. Shuler was re-signed by the Falcons on September 29, 2015. On October 6, 2015, he was released by the Falcons.

References

External links
 Atlanta Falcons bio
 Penn State Nittany Lions bio

1986 births
Living people
People from Cumberland County, Pennsylvania
People from Lido Beach, New York
Sportspeople from Nassau County, New York
Players of American football from Harrisburg, Pennsylvania
American football tight ends
Penn State Nittany Lions football players
Minnesota Vikings players
Miami Dolphins players
Oakland Raiders players
Buffalo Bills players
Arizona Cardinals players
Atlanta Falcons players
Jacksonville Jaguars players